Chah Tarakh-e Olya (also Romanized as Chāh Ţarakh-e ‘Olyā; also known as Chāh Tarakh-e Bālā) is a village in Dastgerdan Rural District, Dastgerdan District, Tabas County, South Khorasan Province, Iran. At the 2006 census, its population was 16, in 5 families.

References 

Populated places in Tabas County